Finglands Coachways was a bus and coach operator in Rusholme, Manchester.

History

Finglands Coachways was founded in 1907, initially as a coach operator. Bus services competing with GM Buses and other operators would be set up following deregulation in 1986. In 1992, Finglands were purchased by East Yorkshire Motor Services, the company's first purchase outside of their native operating area.

In October 1995, Finglands acquired the operations of competitor Stagecoach Manchester, then an operation by Stagecoach Ribble consisting of thirteen buses  competing with Finglands and GM Buses South along route 192.

On 1 August 2013, FirstGroup announced that, subject to regulatory approval, by the Office of Fair Trading, it had agreed to purchase the bus operation. The sale included the lease of Finglands's depot in Rusholme, routes and approximately 100 members of staff, but no buses. The deal was approved in January 2014, with First Greater Manchester taking over on 9 February 2014.

In October 2013, EYMS sold the coach charter part of the business to Bullocks Coaches.

Services
Finglands operated services in Manchester's south including on Wilmslow Road bus corridor routes 41 and 42.

Fleet
As at April 2012, the fleet consisted of 54 buses and coaches.

References

External links

Former bus operators in Greater Manchester
1907 establishments in England
2014 disestablishments in England
Transport companies disestablished in 2014